The following are the national records in speed skating in Kazakhstan maintained by the National Skating Federation of the Republic of Kazakhstan.

Men

Women

References

External links
 National Skating Federation of the Republic of Kazakhstan website

National records in speed skating
Records
Speed skating
Speed skating-related lists
Speed skating